Liverpool University Air Squadron (LUAS ) is a training unit of the Royal Air Force which provides basic flying training, adventurous training and personal development skills to undergraduate students of the University of Liverpool, University of Lancaster, Edge Hill University, Bangor University and Liverpool John Moores University.

History
Liverpool UAS was formed on 12 January 1941 and attached to RAF Speke. It was disbanded on 30 June 1946. It reformed on 1 December 1950 at RAF Hooton Park and moved to RAF Woodvale on 13 July 1951. The De Havilland DH.82 Tiger Moth was flown between 1941 and 1952. De Havilland Chipmunks were flown from 1952 until 1975 when the Scottish Aviation Bulldog was received. The present Grob 115 Tutor aircraft were delivered in 1999 and this type still equips the squadron.

Rationale
The University Air Squadrons are a training program designed for prospective RAF officers to experience air service prior to joining the RAF. UAS training can offer a direct stream for its student pilots to RAF programs. Students participating in UAS are not obliged to enter into the RAF, unless a bursary has been awarded to them by the  OASC. LUAS is parented by RAF Woodvale where it flies Grob Tutor aircraft.

Flight Training

Students follow a modified form of the Elementary Flying Syllabus covering the basics of flight up to solo navigation exercises. Some individuals apply for a PPL from their flying experience on the UAS.

The flying aspect of the LUAS is overseen by the Commanding Officer (OC LUAS) and the Chief Flying Instructor (CFI), both of which are RAF Qualified Flying Instructors (QFI). 

All flying is based at RAF Woodvale where the Grob Tutor is used as the instructional aircraft.

Adventurous Training
LUAS participates in many forms of adventurous training, including climbing, canoeing, kayaking, mountaineering, sailing, ski touring and mountain biking. The squadron's Ground Training Instructor (GTI), an NCO, facilitates most of the above activities.

LUAS relies heavily on student instructors for adventurous training. Qualifications can be gained by attending a Joint Services Adventure Training (JSAT) course. Students attending will be taught the necessary techniques for successful and safe instruction in their chosen discipline, and can then lead others on AT.

Expeditions Abroad
In previous years small deployments to Canada, and dog sledding, and skiing in the European Alps have been popular and worthwhile ventures, including rock climbing, mountaineering, mountain biking and paddle sport.

Mountaineering and Rock Climbing
In addition to larger expeditions, the LUAS squadron undertakes expeditions in the Yorkshire Three Peaks, Lancashire countryside, Snowdonia National Park and Brecons Beacons of Wales to improve climbing and mountaineering skills.

Yacht Sailing
LUAS members can organise yacht sailing expeditions at any time of the year through the Joint Services Adventurous Training Centre.  Student instructors take personnel sailing and teach them how to effectively crew a 30+ foot yacht.

Joining
Students can join LUAS in any year at university, and students from higher education establishments around the North West may apply to join. After completing the joining process a successful student would be attested and become a member of the Volunteer Reserve.

Fitness Requirements
Once attested, students have to pass a medical and a fitness test. The standard is 9.10 on the bleep test, 20 press ups and 35 sit ups.

Bursaries
Bursaries are available for most branches and can be applied for before joining (conferring automatic UAS membership) or after joining a UAS.  The current system gives a successful candidate £6,000 over the course of their degree.
The application process consists of an informal chat with UAS staff or an interview at a career office, for UAS members and non-members respectively. If successful an invitation for selection at the OASC may follow. Successful applicants will be expected to be an example on their squadron and must join the RAF on completion of their degrees, or return all bursary monies.

Staff Structure
The Commanding Officer (OC LUAS) has overall responsibility, supported by the Adjutant who oversees administrative tasks and is supported by office staff at the squadron's headquarters.
The student body has a Senior Student, usually an Acting Pilot Officer (APO) who essentially heads up the student body, and aside from the extra commitment organising activities, he or she acts as a liaison to the permanent staff.  The Senior Student is supported APOs, who oversee the students participation at the airfield and on other aspects respectively.

They are assisted by an executive committee which is chosen from the student body each year. Positions include Adventurous Training Executive, Sports Executive, Charity and PR (Public Relations) Executive, Force Development Executive and Entertainments Executive.
There is a Mess Secretary who records the minutes of Executive Committee meetings and oversees the Mess Committee (below).
A Mess Committee is also elected each year, the above roles serve the function of allowing LUAS to efficiently organise and de-conflict events and activities in a coherent manner.

See also
Birmingham University Air Squadron
East of Scotland Universities Air Squadron
Oxford University Air Squadron
Southampton University Air Squadron
Universities of Glasgow and Strathclyde Air Squadron
University Royal Naval Unit, the Royal Navy equivalent
Officers Training Corps, the British Army equivalent
List of Royal Air Force aircraft squadrons

References
 Sturtivant, R.C., Royal Air Force Flying Training and Support Units, Air-Britain (Historians) Ltd, 1997, .

External links

Squadron website

Clubs and societies of the University of Liverpool
Organisations based in Merseyside
Royal Air Force university air squadrons